Cadair Berwyn North Top or Cadair Berwyn (Old Top) (height  is a top of Cadair Berwyn in north east Wales. It is jointly the second highest summit in the Berwyn range along with Moel Sych (though an accurate survey in 2014 does suggest Moel Sych may be slightly lower at ).

The summit was often considered to be the highest summit in the Berwyns until the OS discovered a new top in between it and Moel Sych, which is 5m higher at 832m. This top, now known as Cadair Berwyn, is listed as Cadair Berwyn New Top on the Nuttall list. The summit is the highest point in the modern Denbighshire council area (possibly jointly with Moel Sych), but not the historic county (which is the higher summit of Cadair Berwyn).

The summit has a trig point. To the north-east is Cadair Bronwen, to the south-east is Tomle, Foel Wen and Mynydd Tarw.

References

External links
www.geograph.co.uk : photos of Cadair Berwyn and surrounding area

Mountains and hills of Denbighshire
Nuttalls

cy:Cadair Berwyn